The Kiwanis Trail is a rail to trail conversion in Adrian, Michigan that roughly follows the River Raisin.

History

The trail occupies the old Detroit, Toledo and Ironton Railroad that extended from Ironton, Ohio to Detroit.

The trail forms the first component of a much longer proposed regional greenway trail, the River Raisin Greenway. If completed, it would extend from Adrian to Manchester, Michigan.

Location

The paved trail is maintained by the parks department of in Adrian. It extends northeast and almost reaches the city of Tecumseh.

External links
Traillink: Kiwanis Trail, MI
Google Maps: Kiwanis Trail, Adrian, MI
Adrian Kiwanas

References

Rail trails in Michigan
Adrian, Michigan
Protected areas of Lenawee County, Michigan